The women's 10 metre platform, also reported as high diving, was one of four diving events on the diving at the 1936 Summer Olympics programme.

The competition was actually held from both the 10 metre and 5 metre platforms and consisted of one set of dives:

Compulsory dives (Thursday, 13 August)
Divers performed four pre-chosen dives – a running straight header forward, standing straight somersault backward (5 metre), a running straight header forward and a standing straight header forward (10 metre).

Results

References

Sources
 
 

Women
1936
1936 in women's diving
Div